Asyla, Op. 17, is an orchestral composition by the British composer Thomas Adès. It was finished in 1997 and has been performed widely, especially by the British conductor Simon Rattle. It has been described as a symphony, the third movement being its unacknowledged scherzo.

Composition 

The title of the composition is the Latin plural form of asylum, which here means both sanctuary and madhouse. It was commissioned by the John Feeney Charitable Trust and was premiered by the City of Birmingham Symphony Orchestra under the baton of Simon Rattle, in Birmingham's Symphony Hall in October 1997.

This piece is best known for its third movement, which features techno-like traits. Adès himself narrated the compositional process as follows:

Asyla received critical praise and won a Royal Philharmonic Society Music Award in 1997 and the Grawemeyer Award for Music Composition in 2000. It was eventually published by Faber Music in 2000.

Analysis 

This composition has four movements and takes 22 to 25 minutes to perform. The movement list is as follows:

It is scored for a very large orchestra, which, in addition to the standard instrumentation, also includes two pianos (a grand piano and an upright piano tuned one quarter tone lower, doubling celesta and grand piano four-hands), six percussionists playing a large range of instruments, and woodwinds doubling bass oboe, bass flute and contrabass clarinet in addition to the standard auxiliaries.

Percussion instruments include 5 or 6 timpani, 3 or 4 roto toms, 5 tuned hand drums, 2 bell plates, an octave of tuned cowbells, 4 tubular bells, chinese cymbal, 2 hi hats, 3 tins, ocean drum, water gong, 2 ratchets, washboard, 11 tuned gongs, 4 suspended cymbals of various sizes, splash cymbal, 2 snare drums, sandpaper blocks, a bag of knives or forks, glockenspiel, clash cymbals, orchestral and kit bass drums, and 2 octaves crotales.

The piece starts with an untitled movement with cowbells and the flat piano, which is immediately followed by the horns and the high-pitched sound of the strings. The general atmosphere of the movement becomes much more agitated when the rest of the orchestra joins in progressively. The second movement begins abruptly and suddenly changes to a soft melody played by the bass oboe. Then the strings take over with a style which has been classified by some critics as "Wagnerian". The sound starts to dissipate towards the end of the movement, fading out using the highest and lowest registers simultaneously.

The third movement tries to resemble "the atmosphere of a massive nightclub with people dancing and taking drugs". It has a steady rhythm which has been compared to Stravinsky's The Rite of Spring. The music here is much more insistent than in the previous movements and is much more vivid and lively. After reaching a climax echoed by the strings, the fourth movement becomes calmer at the beginning, and suddenly turns violent when a tutti chord initiated by the horns bursts towards the end of the piece. Asyla ends in a quiet but trembling manner.

In popular culture 

The third movement is featured in season 4 episode 10 of the Amazon Prime series Mozart in the Jungle.

See also 
 List of compositions by Thomas Adès

References

Further reading
 

Compositions by Thomas Adès
1997 compositions
Contemporary classical compositions
Compositions for symphony orchestra